A  is a seal stamp given to worshippers and visitors to Shinto shrines and Buddhist temples in Japan. The seal stamps are often collected in books called  that are sold at shrines and temples.

The stamps are different from commemorative stamps in that they are made by people who work at the temples: Buddhist Hōshi, or Shinto Kannushi. To create the shuin, the writer presses down one or more large stamps, and then uses black ink to write, in his distinctive calligraphy, the name of the temple, the day of the visit, and other messages on and around the stamped portions.

There are various theories about the origin of shuin, though the strongest is that it was a receipt for a dedicated copied sutra. There are still temples where one cannot receive a shuin without having donated a sutra or money, but the majority of the temples will now accept a small amount of money for a shuin. It usually costs 300 yen, though there are some places that charge up to 1000 yen. At Itsukushima Shrine, there is a sign that asks people to dedicate their feelings.

Special shuinchō (and occasionally hanging scrolls) are available for people who do pilgrimages such as the Kansai Kannon Pilgrimage and the Shikoku Pilgrimage. People who do the Shikoku pilgrimage can also get shuin on the white robes they sometimes wear.

A number of Jōdo Shinshū temples do not offer shuin.

Gallery

References 

Temples in Japan
Shinto religious objects
Buddhist symbols